Bhagwant Global University is a Private university located in Kotdwar , Pauri Garhwal district, Uttarakhand, India.

References

External links

Universities and colleges in Uttarakhand
Private universities in India
Pauri Garhwal district
2016 establishments in Uttarakhand
Educational institutions established in 2016